The Women's singles race of the 2016 FIL World Luge Championships was held on 30 January 2016.

Results
The first run will be started at 15:23 and the final run at 17:07.

References

Women's singles